Temperance is an unincorporated community in Telfair County, in the U.S. state of Georgia.

History
A post office called Temperance was established in 1836, and remained in operation until 1904. The community was named for a nearby campground which hosted the Methodist temperance movement.

References

Unincorporated communities in Georgia (U.S. state)
Unincorporated communities in Telfair County, Georgia